Nardi is a surname and sometimes used as a given name. Notable people with the name include:

 Aldo Nardi (1931–2001), Italian football player
 Andrew Nardi (born 1998), American baseball player
 Angelo Nardi (painter) (1584–1664), Italian painter active in Spain
 Antonio Nardi (1548–1648?), Tuscan man of letters and mathematician
 Archimede Nardi (born 1916), Italian football player
 Bonnie Nardi (born 1950), American anthropologist 
 Caesar Nardi (died 1633), Roman Catholic Bishop of Ossero 
 Clarine Nardi Riddle (born 1949), American Attorney General of Connecticut
 Daniela Nardi, Canadian singer-songwriter
 Enrico Nardi (1907–1966), Italian racing car driver
 Filippo Nardi (born 1998), Italian footballer 
 François Nardi (1861–1936), French painter
 Gloria Nardi (born 2000), Italian racing cyclist
 Gregorio Nardi (born 1964), Italian pianist and musicologist
 Jacopo Nardi (1476–1563), Italian historian
 John Nardi (1916–1977), American mobster
 José Carlos De Nardi (born 1944), Brazilian general
 Luca Nardi (born 2003), Italian tennis player
 Marcia Nardi (1901–1990), American poet and book reviewer
 Maria Nardi (born 1935), Italian swimmer
 Mariacristina De Nardi, Italian economist
 Marie-Ange Nardi (born 1961), French television presenter
 Mauro Nardi, stage name of Antonio Borrelli (born 1954), Italian singer
 Michele Nardi (born 1986), Italian footballer
 Mike Nardi (born 1985), American basketball player
 Nahum Nardi (1901–1977), Israeli composer
 Paul Nardi (born 1994), French footballer
 Rafaela Chacón Nardi (1926–2001), Cuban poet and educator
 Ricardo Alberto Gareca Nardi (born 1958), Argentine football manager and player
 Tonino Nardi (1939–1993), Italian cinematographer
 Tony Nardi (born 1958), Canadian actor, playwright, Director, and producer
 Uldericus Nardi (1637–1705), Roman Catholic Bishop of Bagnoregio

Given name
 Nardi Contreras (born 1951), American baseball player
Nardi Simpson (born 1975), Australian musician and writer
 Nardi Steverink, Dutch sociologist
 Nardi Suxo (born 1961), Bolivian lawyer, sociologist, and politician

See also
 Nardi (disambiguation)
 Nardis (disambiguation)